Bethlehem Township is one of the twenty-two townships of Coshocton County, Ohio, United States. As of the 2010 census the population was 1,123.

Geography
Located in the north central part of the county, it borders the following townships:
Clark Township - north
Mill Creek Township - northeast corner
Keene Township - east
Jackson Township - south
Bedford Township - southwest corner
Jefferson Township - west
Monroe Township - northwest corner

No municipalities are located in Bethlehem Township.

Name and history
Bethlehem Township was organized in 1826.

Statewide, the only other Bethlehem Township is located in Stark County.

Government
The township is governed by a three-member board of trustees, who are elected in November of odd-numbered years to a four-year term beginning on the following January 1. Two are elected in the year after the presidential election and one is elected in the year before it. There is also an elected township fiscal officer, who serves a four-year term beginning on April 1 of the year after the election, which is held in November of the year before the presidential election. Vacancies in the fiscal officership or on the board of trustees are filled by the remaining trustees.

References

External links
County website

Townships in Coshocton County, Ohio
Townships in Ohio